Alfonso de la Cruz Calero (born 17 July 1986) is a Spanish footballer who plays as a centre-back for  Segunda División B club Villarrobledo

External links 

Living people
1986 births
Spanish footballers
Association football defenders
UD Almería B players
CD Toledo players
UD Somozas players
CD Ebro players
Selangor FA players
Segunda División B players
Tercera División players
Malaysia Super League players
Spanish expatriate footballers
Expatriate footballers in Malaysia
Lorca Atlético CF players
Caravaca CF players

Expatriate footballers in Indonesia